Epitácio may refers to:

People
Epitácio Cafeteira (1924-2018), Brazilian politician
Epitácio Pais (1924-2009), Goan Indian novelist
Epitácio Pessoa (1865-1942), former president of Brazil

Places
Epitacio Huerta Municipality, a municipality in Michoacán, Mexico
Presidente Epitácio, a municipality in São Paulo, Brazil